Krohne is a surname. People with the surname include:

 Johanne Krohne, birth name of Johanne Schjørring (1836–1910), Danish author
 Rogier Krohne (born 1986), Dutch football player
 Rudolf Krohne (1876–1953), German jurist and politician

German-language surnames